Engineering drawing abbreviations and symbols are used to communicate and detail the characteristics of an engineering drawing. This list includes abbreviations common to the vocabulary of people who work with engineering drawings in the manufacture and inspection of parts and assemblies.

Technical standards exist to provide glossaries of abbreviations, acronyms, and symbols that may be found on engineering drawings. Many corporations have such standards, which define some terms and symbols specific to them; on the national and international level, ASME standard Y14.38 is one of the widely used standards.

See also
List of geometric dimensioning and tolerancing symbols

References

Bibliography

Sources cited

Further reading

External Links 
 

Engineering concepts
Engineering